Matthew Ebden was the defending champion but chose not to defend his title.

Ričardas Berankis won the title after defeating Andrew Harris 7–6(7–5), 6–2 in the final.

Seeds
All seeds receive a bye into the second round.

Draw

Finals

Top half

Section 1

Section 2

Bottom half

Section 3

Section 4

References

External links
Main draw
Qualifying draw

Busan Open - Singles
2019 Singles